The discography of the Queers, an American punk rock band, consists of 13 studio albums, 9 live albums, 4 compilation albums, 1 video album, 3 music videos, 22 EPs, 1 single, and 1 split album.

After forming in 1981, the Queers released two EPs in the early 1980s, Love Me (1982) and Kicked Out of the Webelos (1984), both on band leader Joe Queer's Doheny Records imprint. Their first album, Grow Up, was released in 1990 through British independent record label Shakin' Street Records. The band then signed to Lookout! Records, who reissued Grow Up and released the subsequent studio albums Love Songs for the Retarded (1993), Beat Off (1994), Move Back Home (1995), and Don't Back Down (1996), as well as the compilation albums A Day Late and a Dollar Short (1996) and Later Days and Better Lays (1999). The Queers also released a cover version of the Ramones' Rocket to Russia album in 1994 through Selfless Records, as well as two live albums and a number of EPs through other labels during these years.

The band then moved to Hopeless Records, releasing the studio albums Punk Rock Confidential (1998) and Beyond the Valley... (2000) and the live album Live in West Hollywood (2001). They returned to Lookout! for the Today EP (2001) and album Pleasant Screams (2002), but soon parted ways with the label again. A split album with Italian band the Manges, titled Acid Beaters, was released in 2003 through Stardumb Records, followed by 2004's stopgap album Summer Hits No. 1 on Suburban Home Records, consisting of new recordings of songs from the Queers' back catalog.

In 2006 the Queers followed several other former Lookout! artists in rescinding their master tapes and licensing rights from the label. They signed to Asian Man Records, who released their eleventh studio album, Munki Brain (2007), and also reissued all of their Lookout! albums (excepting Later Days and Better Lays), having all of them remastered (and all but A Day Late and a Dollar Short and Pleasant Screams remixed) by the band's longtime collaborator Mass Giorgini. Licensing rights to several of these reissues subsequently passed to Dayton, Ohio-based Rad Girlfriend Records. A twelfth studio album, Back to the Basement, followed on Asian Man in 2010. The Queers also released 8 split EPs with various other bands between 2004 and 2018. Most recently, the Queers re-recorded both of their Hopeless albums, issuing Beyond the Valley Revisited: Live at Loud & Clear Studios in 2016 through Asian Man and Punk Rock Confidential Revisited in 2018 through Asian Man, Rad Girlfriend, and the band's own new imprint, All Star Records.

Studio albums

Live albums

Compilation albums

Video albums

Music videos

EPs

Singles

Split albums

Other appearances 
The following Queers songs were released on compilation albums. This is not an exhaustive list; songs that originally appeared on the band's albums, EPs, or singles are not included.

References

Queers
Queers